Potassium voltage-gated channel subfamily F member 1 is a protein that in humans is encoded by the KCNF1 gene. The protein encoded by this gene is a voltage-gated potassium channel subunit.

References

Further reading

External links 
 
 

Ion channels